Rizal Avenue primarily is a road in Caloocan and Manila, Philippines.

Rizal Avenue may also refer to the following roads in the Philippines:

 Rizal Avenue in Albuera, part of the Pan-Philippine Highway
 Rizal Avenue in Candelaria, part of the Pan-Philippine Highway
 Rizal Avenue in Digos, part of the Pan-Philippine Highway
 Rizal Avenue in Lanao del Sur, part of the Pan-Philippine Highway
 Rizal Avenue in Olongapo, part of the N305 highway (Philippines) and N3 highway (Philippines)
 Rizal Avenue in Sorsogon City, part of the Pan-Philippine Highway
 Rizal Avenue in Taytay, Rizal, part of N601 highway (Philippines)
 Rizal Avenue in Tukuran, part of the Pan-Philippine Highway
 Rizal Avenue Extension in Catbalogan, part of the Pan-Philippine Highway
 Rizal Avenue Extension in Malabon, alternate name of Paterio Aquino Avenue
 José Rizal Avenue in San Pablo, Laguna, part of N67 highway (Philippines)
 J. P. Rizal Avenue in Binangonan, part of the Manila East Road
 J. P. Rizal Avenue in Laoag, part of the Pan-Philippine Highway
 J. P. Rizal Avenue, a tertiary road in Makati
 J. P. Rizal Avenue in Pagadian, part of the Pan-Philippine Highway